12 O'Clock is a 1958 Bollywood Thriller and Mystery film starring Guru Dutt, Waheeda Rehman and Rehman. It was produced by G.P. Sippy and directed by Pramod Chakravorty. It was listed in Best Bollywood Noirs of 1950s by Filmfare, citing, While Guru Dutt is as effective as ever and Waheeda looks suitably grief-stricken and confused, the film belongs to Rehman, who plays Bani's manipulative brother-in-law to perfection.

Plot
At exactly 12:00 noon, two gunshots are fired at the Dadar Railway Station, Bombay. The gunshots kill Maya (Sabita Chatterji), the wife of Raimohan (Rehman). One of the assailants is none other than Maya's sister, Bani Choudhary (Waheeda Rehman), and a gun is recovered from her handbag. The second assailant flees on a motorcycle, meets with an accident, and is instantly killed. The police charge Bani with murdering her sister. Faced with overwhelming evidence against Bani, her lawyer boyfriend, Ajay Kumar (Guru Dutt) must race against time to come to the truth behind Maya's murder.

Cast

Guru Dutt as Ajay Kumar
Waheeda Rehman as Bani Chaudhary
Shashikala as Neena
Rehman as Raimohan
Johnny Walker as Motilal Sharma 'Moti'
Sabita Chatterji as Maya
Ashita Mujumdar as Marina
Umadevi as Kumari Natesh Sundari
Amrit Rana
Abrar Alvi as Police Inspector
Tanvir	
Rajen Kapoor as Kapoor
Jagdish Nirulla
Bhishan Khanna  
Jagdish as Police Inspector Chauhan
Shankar
Sitaram
Govind 		
Raj 		
Mirajkar 
Sagar	
Hari Sivdasani as Bali's Mamaji	
Helen as Dancer in song "Arey Tauba"

Soundtrack
Songs of the film were penned by Sahir Ludhianvi and Majrooh Sultanpuri while the music was composed by O. P. Nayyar.

References

External links
 12 O'Clock at IMDb

1958 films
1950s Hindi-language films
Films scored by O. P. Nayyar
Hindi-language thriller films